Charitosomus is an extinct genus of prehistoric bony fish. They were nektonic carnivores in life.

See also

 Prehistoric fish
 List of prehistoric bony fish

References 

Prehistoric bony fish genera